María Monvel (born Tilda Brito in 1899; died 1936) was a Chilean poet of national significance. Her work was highly praised by Gabriela Mistral.

References 

Chilean people of French descent
Chilean women poets
People from Iquique
1899 births
1936 deaths